Mahamalar is a village and municipality in the Balakan District of Azerbaijan. It has a population of 4,752. The municipality consists of the villages of Mahamalar and Solban.  The  is common in the village of Mahamalar. The postal code is AZ0823.

References 

Populated places in Balakan District